Hristovaia is a village in the Camenca District of Transnistria, Moldova. It has since 1990 been administered as a part of the breakaway Pridnestrovian Moldavian Republic (PMR).

References

External links 
 
 

Villages of Transnistria
Bratslav Voivodeship
Olgopolsky Uyezd
Camenca District